Keklikköy can refer to:

 Keklikköy, Çermik
 Keklikköy, Karakoçan